Lublin University of Technology (Politechnika Lubelska) is an engineering university in Lublin, Poland. It was established on May 13, 1953, and currently has 7,787 students.

Rectors
 Stanisław Ziemecki (1953-1956)
 Stanisław Podkowa (1956-1973)
 Włodzimierz Sitko (1973-1981)
 Jakub Mames (1981-1982)
 Andrzej Weroński (1982-1984)
 Włodzimierz Sitko (1984-1990)
 Włodzimierz Krolopp (1990-1993)
 Iwo Pollo (1993-1996)
 Kazimierz Szabelski (1996-2002)
 Józef Kuczmaszewski (2002-2008)
 Marek Opielak (2008-2012)
 Piotr Kacejko (2012-2020)
 Zbigniew Pater (2020–present)

Faculties
 Faculty of Civil Engineering and Architecture
 Faculty of Electrical Engineering and Computer Science
 Faculty of Mechanical Engineering
 Faculty of Environmental Engineering
 Faculty of Technology Fundamentals
 Faculty of Management

Fields of Study
 Architecture
 Civil Engineering
 Technical and Computer Science Education
 Electrical Engineering
 Finance and Accounting
 Computer Science
 Security Engineering
 Biomedical Engineering
 Data engineering and Analysis
 Logistics Engineering
 Materials Engineering
 Multimedia Engineering
 Renewable Energy Engineering
 Production Engineering
 Environmental Engineering
 Engineering Applications of Computer Science in Electrical Engineering
 Marketing and Market Communication
 Mathematics
 Mechanics and Machine Design
 Mechatronics
 Robotization of Manufacturing Processes
 Transport
 Management
 Management and Production Engineering

Scientific Disciplines
 Mechanical Engineering
 Automatics, Electronics and Electrical Engineering
 Technical Informatics and Telecommunications
 Architecture and Urban Planning
 Civil Engineering and Transport
 Environmental Engineering, Mining and Power Engineering
 Management and Quality Science

References

External links

 Official site

Universities and colleges in Lublin
Educational institutions established in 1953
1953 establishments in Poland
Universities in Poland